Nodir Naam Modhumoti (translated as The River Named Modhumoti) is a 1996 Bangladeshi Bengali language film directed by Tanvir Mokammel. It won 20th Bangladesh National Film Awards for the Best Story, Best Dialogue and Best Male Playback Singer.

Background
The film was banned by the Censor Board in 1994 citing the reason "anti-nationalist". Mokammel appealed this ban to the Bangladesh Supreme Court, and then to the High Court. The film was released later in 1996.

Cast
 Tauquir Ahmed
 Aly Zaker
 Raisul Islam Asad
 Sara Zaker
 Afsana Mimi
 Abul Khair

Soundtrack
The music of this film was directed by Syed Shabab Ali Arzoo.

Awards

References

External links
 

1996 films
Bengali-language Bangladeshi films
Bangladeshi drama films
1990s Bengali-language films
Films directed by Tanvir Mokammel
Films based on the Bangladesh Liberation War
1996 drama films